Visakhapatnam Public Library is a public library in Visakhapatnam city, in Andhra Pradesh, India. It provides free library services, a reading environment, a social space, free wi-fi and study room services to the general public. The Centre for Policy Studies, a sister organisation is co-located in the building.

History
The library was conceived in 1996 by a group of public-minded citizens. A plot of  land was provided by then-Mayor of Visakhapatnam, Sabbam Hari. The foundation stone was laid on 23 October 1999. The Library was inaugurated on 3 December 2003 by Shri Surjit Singh Barnala, then Governor of Andhra Pradesh. It began operating from 15 July 2004.

The library is owned by the Greater Visakhapatnam Municipal Corporation. A trust, Visakhapatnam Public Library Society, was formed comprising eminent citizens to direct the affairs of the library. As of 2019, the chairman is Dr S. Vijaya Kumar and the Secretary is Mr DS Varma.

References

2003 establishments in Andhra Pradesh
Libraries in Andhra Pradesh
Education in Visakhapatnam
Buildings and structures in Visakhapatnam
Libraries established in 2003